Mitchell Thomas Laddie (born 24 September 1990) is an English  guitarist, vocalist, songwriter, producer and tutor from Consett, County Durham. He was born in Shotley Bridge, County Durham, and raised in Ebchester.

Blues & Soul has described Laddie as "the most exciting young blues player of the current bunch and probably the only serious prospect for major global success this country has produced in several decades". His 2012 full-length album Burning Bridges also won Blues & Soul's "Album Of The Year".

Early life

Mitchell Thomas Laddie was born on 24 September 1990 in Shotley Bridge, County Durham, England, and grew up in Ebchester, County Durham. He is of Irish descent. Influenced by his Grandfather's love of music and his parents' record collection, which heavily included blues and prog rock, Laddie was drawn to music from an early age. Growing up in a house full of guitars, he became fascinated with the instrument and often picked up and played with his Father's Stratocaster. At the age of five, he discovered Motown music and was later influenced by artists such as Michael Jackson and Stevie Wonder.

After a sporting injury at the age of 13, Laddie was hospitalised for several months. It was during this time he began playing guitar seriously, influenced by the likes of Jimi Hendrix, Chuck Berry and Dave Gilmour. Upon discovering Stevie Ray Vaughan his love of Blues music was rekindled, leading to heavy influence from Albert King, BB King, Walter Trout and Vaughan. He formed his first band, Vanilla Moon at the age of 14 with school friends. During his mid-teens, Laddie's influences began to expand into Jazz, Soul, Funk and Fusion, from artists such as Kenny Burrell, Miles Davis, James Brown, Prince, D'Angelo, Eric Johnson and Robben Ford.

Career

Early career - This Time Around (2006-2010)
Laddie met Blues guitarist and idol Walter Trout at the age of 15, and was asked to join the guitarist on stage the following year. This led to further appearances around the UK and in the Netherlands. It was during a performance with Trout at the Paradiso (Amsterdam) that landed him his first recording contract with Provogue Records at the age of 17.

Laddie's debut album This Time Around was recorded in 2009, produced by Laddie and released in 2010 on Mascot Label Group, gaining positive critical response from Classic Rock Magazine and receiving airplay on various radio stations, including BBC Radio 2. The album was promoted with a UK and European tour with Walter Trout Band & UK tour with fellow Provogue artist Scott McKeon.

Burning Bridges (2011-2013)
Laddie later moved to UK-based Mystic Records, and his follow-up album Burning Bridges was recorded in 2011 and released in 2012, again produced by Laddie. The album was received to critical acclaim, gaining heavy press coverage from Classic Rock Magazine, Blues & Soul, R2 (Rock'n'Reel) & Blues Matters! as well as coverage on various radio stations. Laddie also recorded a live session at Maida Vale for BBC Radio 2. The album was later voted joint Album of the Year by Blues & Soul in 2012, tied with Tedeschi Trucks Band. The album was promoted with various UK and European tours, alongside Johnny Winter, Royal Southern Brotherhood and Walter Trout.

Live In Concert & Mitch Laddie Band (2013-2014)
Laddie revamped his band line-up in late 2012 and later branded himself as Mitch Laddie Band in 2013. The band's first move was to give in to fan demand and release a Live album. Live In Concert was recorded on 13 September 2013 at The Cluny, Newcastle-upon-Tyne to a sell out show and released in early 2014. The album featured new tracks "Linger" & "Open Your Eyes (Take It Back)" which became tracks on the band's next studio album. Mitch Laddie Band played Royal Albert Hall in 2014 as part of "BluesFest, sharing the stage with the likes of Sheryl Crow, Robert Cray & Gregory Porter.

Let You Go (2015-2017)
In 2015, Mitch Laddie broke away from Mystic Records and formed Independent record label "MLBP" and began work on his third studio album, "Let You Go" with Mitch Laddie Band.  MLB set a goal to write, record, engineer and produce an album on their own with no outside influence. The album was recorded over the period of 4 months at the band's personal studios at Steel Town Music in County Durham, UK. The album was independently released under the MLBP label in September 2015 and was praised for the band's songwriting, production and change of direction, citing a Soul and R&B influence. "Classic Rock: The Blues" magazine said "It's time to get funky as this Blues Man becomes a Soul brother" & "Blues Rock Review" saying "Once you listen to Let You Go, you will understand why The Mitch Laddie Band are popular in the UK. They have the ability to bring a variety of sounds together successfully, creating unique music that will get you groovin’."

Another World (2018-2019)
2018 saw Mitch Laddie's fourth studio album "Another World" released on Independent record label "MLBP" with Mitch Laddie Band. Again recorded at the band's personal studios: Steel Town Music, County Durham UK. "Another World" saw the band heading back towards their Blues roots yet providing a kaleidoscopic palette for the genre throughout the record. Of the album, "Blues Rock Review" said "'Another World' is a strong compendium of material that deserves attention...Eclectic, that’s the word. Mitch Laddie and his band from the North East of England are not one-trick ponies. Laddie clearly knows his Hendrix, but isn’t in thrall to him. Vocally he’s at ease with soulful and funky, but can give it a bit oomph, too. He can throw in some jazzy tweaks that suggest Steely Dan, but balance that with blues rock grit. And he can get rootsy, but can do it with a dash of imagination." This album also saw the addition of guest member in saxophonist Johnny 'Bluehat' Davis, known for his work with Sam Fender.

Wave of Illusion (2019-present)
In late 2019, Mitch took some time away from Mitch Laddie Band, forming new Independent record label "Test Dream Productions"  and began work on a solo project that would see him recording all instruments and undertaking all production responsibilities. After releasing singles "Musk" & "Dirty Kink," Laddie announced that a new solo album would be released on his 30th birthday, 24 September 2020. The album was completed at  Mitch's home studio during the outbreak of the COVID-19 pandemic in the United Kingdom. "Wave of Illusion" saw a break away from the Blues genre, with heavy influences from Prince, Michael Jackson & Kate Bush. Talking about the record Laddie said, "This album started with an idea – to make a record on my own with a completely different direction. All the instruments (minus some great guests), all of the production, mixing and mastering. I wanted to make something that was inspired and influenced by the classic records and artists I grew up loving. The 70s and 80s, when records were about going out, dancing and having a blast. The Quincy Jones era of gold, Prince, Stevie Wonder, The Jacksons, but fuse it with all of the contemporary artists I love now: Frank Ocean, Dabeull, Nao, D’Angelo, with a sprinkle of the 80s soundtracks I adore. I wanted to hit on a vibe I haven’t recorded before, moving away from the Blues/Rock scene I was born into and show people what I’m really about. What came out was something bigger than I ever could have hoped for, this is a project I can say I’m truly proud of. It’s me".

Discography
This Time Around (2010) Provogue
Burning Bridges (2012) Mystic Records
Live In Concert (2014) Mystic Records 
Let You Go (2015) MLBP
Another World (2018) MLBP
Wave of Illusion (2020) Test Dream Productions

References

1990 births
English blues guitarists
English male guitarists
Living people
21st-century British guitarists
21st-century British male musicians
People from Shotley Bridge
People from Ebchester
Provogue Records artists